Brachysomida bivittata is the species of the Lepturinae subfamily in longhorn beetle family. The beetle is distributed in Canada, and Nebraska, United States.

The species is between 7-11 millimeter long.

Subtaxons
There are three varietets in species:
Brachysomida bivittata var. fusciceps (LeConte, 1850)
Brachysomida bivittata var. nigripennis (LeConte, 1850)
Brachysomida bivittata var. varians (LeConte, 1850)

References

Beetles described in 1824
Lepturinae